Mad Labs is a British TV documentary series for the National Geographic Channel. The show focuses mainly on "wacky" experiments and inventions that may prove useful in the near future such as urine-powered batteries or solar panels with olive oil being the key ingredient instead of silica.

While the show features real-life scientists and their inventions, a regular segment called "The Test Department" appears numerous times in an episode wherein the show's own testers perform experiments of their own.

References

External links
 National Geographic Channel UK – Mad Labs homepage

National Geographic (American TV channel) original programming
British documentary television series